Teberda (Teberdi) is a town under the administrative jurisdiction of the town of republic significance of Karachayevsk in the Karachay–Cherkess Republic, Russia, located in the Caucasus Mountains  south of Cherkessk at the elevation of about . Population:   The Teberda River flows through the town. It is the gateway to the Teberda Nature Reserve, an area is known for its natural environment and hiking trails.

History
It was founded in 1868 as a Karachay settlement, and was originally called Baychoralany-Kyabak. Town status was granted to it in 1971.

From 1944 till 1957 Teberda was part of Georgian Soviet Socialist Republic.

Demographics
In 2002, the population included:
Karachays (64.0%)
Russians (29.1%)
Ossetians (1.1%)
all other ethnicities comprising less than 1% of population each.

References

Cities and towns in Karachay-Cherkessia